Canon X-07 is one of the first personal computers available in France manufactured by Canon.
This is a laptop (or rather hand-held) based around the NSC800 (compatible with Z80) shipping Microsoft BASIC.

The specifications included:
 memory extensions or independent IC card
 parallel and serial port with an infrared extension X-721
 X-711 thermal printer or plotter 4-color X-710 or standard // printer.
 ROM card software (spreadsheet, monitor ...)
 X-720 video interface for connection to a TV
 save to cassette
 Size: 30x30x11cm

References 

Computing by computer model
Canon Inc.
Personal computers